Massacre Lake is a lake in the U.S. state of Nevada.

Massacre Lake was named in commemoration of the 1850 massacre of a party of pioneers.

However, a later study suggests that a massacre never occurred at this site.

References

Lakes of Washoe County, Nevada